William Gaudette (born September 14, 1981 in Hummelstown, Pennsylvania) is a retired American-born Puerto Rican footballer who played for several MLS teams and the Puerto Rican national team.

Gaudette commenced his soccer career at Lower Dauphin High School, period in which he had the opportunity to train with a talented Brazilian host brother before matriculating onto St. John's University at the college level and becoming an All-American. Also suiting up for the Brooklyn Knights of the USL Premier Development League during the collegiate off-season. After an exceptional career at St. John's, the Columbus Crew selected him 9th overall in the 2005 MLS Draft. His tenure with the Crew saw him serve primarily as backup to Jon Busch due to injury.

In 2008, Gaudette was transferred to the Puerto Rico Islanders of the USL First Division, where he would transform himself into an elite goalkeeper in North America. His contributions led the club to its first regular season championship, as well as leading the Islanders to the playoff finals. His crucial performances in the CONCACAF Champions League provided Puerto Rico with stunning results over regional powerhouses. In February 2010 he was ranked 17th in the USL First Division Top 25 of the Decade, which announced a list of the best and most influential USL players of the previous decade.

Career

College and amateur
Gaudette played college soccer at St. John's University from 2001 to 2004, where he finished with a 43–13–12 record.  During this period, he also played for the Brooklyn Knights of the USL Premier Development League during the collegiate off-season.

Professional
Gaudette was drafted in the first round, 9th overall, by Columbus Crew in the 2005 MLS Draft and was part of the team through the 2007 season. He was acquired by Puerto Rico Islanders as their head goalkeeper in early 2008. Gaudette was brought in by Colin Clarke in Clarke's attempt to re-shape the club ahead of the 2008 campaign. During the season, Gaudette made a notable appearance for the Islanders during a match he started against the Rochester Rhinos. Throughout the entire game he was able to shut out the Rhinos in a 4–0 victory for Puerto Rico. It was a memorable victory because it placed the club atop the league's standings for the first time in the club's history. In the final stages of the season, Gaudette managed to assist the club in remaining at the top of the standings. On September 19, Puerto Rico won the club's first Commissioners Cup since their creation, clinching first place in the league's regular season standings. At the end of the 2008 regular season Gaudette had a GAA of 0.851; he also had 10 shutouts and finished as the league's leader in victories with 14. On September 30, 2008, he received the Goalkeeper of the Year award and was selected into the USL First Division All-League First Team. In the club's playoff run, he led the Islanders to the USL 1 Division final only to be defeated by Vancouver Whitecaps by a score of 2–1.

It was in the 2008–09 CONCACAF Champions League where Gaudette established himself as a top-notch goalkeeper in the CONCACAF region, as the Islanders would eventually reach the semi-finals of the tournament due to his first-rate performance. In the preliminary round the Islanders were matched up against regional powerhouse L.D. Alajuelense where in both legs, Gaudette performed well and helped Puerto Rico advance to the group stage. While in the group stage the Islanders managed a victory over Club Santos Laguna, where once again Gaudette's performance led to a 3–1 result. Gaudette led the Islanders to the semi-finals where their opponents were C.D.S.C. Cruz Azul. In the first leg match he earned a shutout victory over the Mexican side, as the Islanders defeated Cruz Azul two goals to none. On the second leg, Cruz Azul won 2–0 and drove the game into extra time, where it ended 3–1. The game was decided through penalties and ended 4–2 in favor of Cruz Azul.

During the 2009 season, he finished with 15 wins, which tied him for the league lead with Steve Cronin, placed fifth in the league in goals against average at 0.74, and recorded 12 shutouts to tie for the league lead with Dusty Hudock. On September 29, 2009, he was selected into the USL First Division All-League Second Team. On April 1, 2010, Gaudette signed a new contract with Puerto Rico for the 2010 season.

Gaudette signed a one-year contract with Montreal Impact of the North American Soccer League on February 19, 2011.

On February 29, 2012 Gaudette signed with Los Angeles Galaxy of Major League Soccer.  His debut was against FC Dallas in a 1–1 draw. In his second match against Seattle Sounders FC, Gaudette made 4 saves in a 0–2 defeat. His third match for Los Angeles was a 0–1 defeat to New York Red Bulls. This proved to be his final match for the club. On July 13, Gaudette was traded to New York for a 2014 Supplemental Draft pick. On November 15, Gaudette was denied a contract extension, thus ending his tenure in New York. In December, he entered the 2012 MLS Re-Entry Draft and became a free agent after going undrafted in both rounds of the draft.

International
On May 27, 2012, Gaudette was called up by Puerto Rico for the team's friendly matches against Nicaragua on June 1 and June 3. In his first game as goalkeeper, Puerto Rico defeated Nicaragua 3–1.

On August 19, 2012, Gaudette was called up again for a friendly match against world and European champion Spain. Gaudette presented an outstanding display defending the goal where, out of 19 shots on target, only 2 went in. The match finished 2–1 in favor of Spain.

In October 2012 he played two more matches with Puerto Rico on the first round of the Caribbean Cup helping Puerto Rico to get two victories (2-1 against Bermuda and 9–0 against Saint Martin).

Honors

Club
Puerto Rico Islanders
 USSF Division 2 Pro League Champions: 2010
 Commissioner's Cup  Winners: 2008
 CFU Club Championship Winner: 2010

Individual
 USL First Division Goalkeeper of the Year: 2008

References

External links
 Puerto Rico Islanders bio
 
 

1981 births
Living people
American soccer players
Puerto Rican footballers
Puerto Rico international footballers
St. John's Red Storm men's soccer players
Brooklyn Knights players
Columbus Crew players
Puerto Rico Islanders players
Montreal Impact (1992–2011) players
LA Galaxy players
New York Red Bulls players
Expatriate soccer players in Canada
Columbus Crew draft picks
USL League Two players
Major League Soccer players
USL First Division players
USSF Division 2 Professional League players
North American Soccer League players
Soccer players from Pennsylvania
Association football goalkeepers
People from Hummelstown, Pennsylvania